In 1933 the Gernrode-Harzgerode Railway Company (GHE) bought this twin-axled, narrow gauge railbus from Waggonfabrik Dessau and classified it as GHE T 1 within its vehicle fleet. The vehicle remained a one-off; bus services were more important to the GHE. After the Second World War the railbus remained at Eisfelder Talmühle station and as a result evaded Russian reparation measures. In the time that followed, it was redesignated as VT 133 522, and took over the traffic on the remaining section of the Selke Valley Railway between Eisfelder Talmühle and Hasselfelde. Later it returned to duties on its home line between Gernrode and Straßberg (Harz), but was only used as a tool wagon. With its 34 seats and 10 standing places it was just too small. In 1972 it was given its present-day computerised number of 187 001 by the Deutsche Reichsbahn (GDR) in East Germany. Today the Harz Narrow Gauge Railways uses it exclusively for railway specials.

Currently (2007) the vehicle is stabled as its licence has expired.

External links

The railbus at the Freundeskreis Selketalbahn

Private locomotives of Germany 
German railbuses